Phosphoprotein associated with glycosphingolipid-enriched microdomains 1 is a protein that in humans is encoded by the PAG1 gene.

The protein encoded by this gene is a type III transmembrane adaptor protein that binds to the tyrosine kinase csk protein. It is thought to be involved in the regulation of T cell activation.

Interactions 

PAG1 has been shown to interact with FYN, C-src tyrosine kinase, Sodium-hydrogen antiporter 3 regulator 1 and Abl gene.

References

Further reading